Cold shock response is a series of neurogenic cardio-respiratory responses caused by sudden immersion in cold water.

In cold water immersions, such as by falling through thin ice, cold shock response is perhaps the most common cause of death. Also, the abrupt contact with very cold water may cause involuntary inhalation, which, if underwater, can result in fatal drowning.

Death which occurs in such scenarios is complex to investigate and there are several possible causes and phenomena that can take part. The cold water can cause heart attack due to severe vasoconstriction, where the heart has to work harder to pump the same volume of blood throughout the arteries. For people with pre-existing cardiovascular disease, the additional workload can result in myocardial infarction and/or acute heart failure, which ultimately may lead to a cardiac arrest. A vagal response to an extreme stimulus as this one, may, in very rare cases, render per se a cardiac arrest. Hypothermia and extreme stress can both precipitate fatal tachyarrhythmias. A more modern view suggests that an autonomic conflict — sympathetic (due to stress) and parasympathetic (due to the diving reflex) coactivation — may be responsible for some cold water immersion deaths. Gasp reflex and uncontrollable tachypneia can severely increase the risk of water inhalation and drowning.

Some people are much better prepared to survive sudden exposure to very cold water due to body and mental characteristics and due to conditioning.  In fact, cold water swimming (also known as ice swimming or winter swimming) is a sport and an activity that reportedly can lead to several health benefits when done regularly.

Physiological response

Cold water immersion syndrome — four-stage model 
The physiological response to a sudden immersion in cold water may be divided in three or four discrete stages, with different risks and physiological changes, all being part of an entity labelled as Cold Water Immersion Syndrome. Although this process is a continuum, the 4 phases was initially described in the 1980s as it follows:  

The first stage of cold water immersion syndrome, the cold shock response, includes a group of reflexes lasting under 5 min in laboratory volunteers and initiated by thermoreceptors sensing rapid skin cooling.  Water has a thermal conductivity 25 times and a volume-specific heat capacity over 3000 times that of air; subsequently, surface cooling is precipitous. The primary components of the cold shock reflex include gasping, tachypnea, reduced breath-holding time, and peripheral vasoconstriction, the latter effect highlighting the presumed physiologic principle (i.e., warmth preservation via central blood shunting). The magnitude of the cold shock response parallels the cutaneous cooling rate, and its termination is likely due to reflex baroreceptor responses or thermoreceptor habituation.

Diving reflex 
The mammalian diving reflex consists of a series of adaptive reflexes which occur after submersion in cold water. The physiologic purpose of the diving reflex is not well understood, but is believed to be oxygen conservation, a quality evident in diving mammals, in which the response is most pronounced. The diving reflex encompasses bradycardia (cardiac parasympathetic control), expiratory apnea (respiratory control center), peripheral vasoconstriction (vasomotor control center), adrenal catecholamine release, and vascular splenic contraction.

Cardiac arrhythmias and autonomic conflict 

Early models of cold water immersion syndrome focused primarily on sympathetic responses, but recent research suggests sympathetic and parasympathetic coactivation (autonomic conflict) may be  responsible for some cold water immersion deaths. Although reciprocal activation between sympathetic (cold shock) and parasympathetic (diving response) systems is commonly adaptive (follow one another), simultaneous activation appears to be associated with ectopic beats or arrhythmias. Cold water induced rhythm disturbances are common, albeit frequently asymptomatic. In most humans, head-out cold-water immersion results in sympathetically driven sinus tachycardia with variable ectopic beats and supraventricular or junctional arrhythmias. These cold water immersion induced arrythmias appear to be accentuated by parasympathetic stimulation resulting from facial submersion or breath holding. Even vagally dominant diving bradycardia caused by isolated cold water facial immersion frequently is interrupted by supraventricular arrhythmias or premature beats. In theory, atrioventricular blockade or sinus arrest due to profound parasympathetic dominance might result in syncope or sudden cardiac death, but these rhythms tend to be rapidly reversed by lung stretch receptor activation associated with breathing. As such, a vagally produced arrest scenario is likelier during entrapment submersion than in flush drowning.

Conditioning against cold shock
It is possible to undergo physiological conditioning to reduce the cold shock response, and some people are naturally better suited to swimming in very cold water. Beneficial adaptations include the following:
 having an insulating layer of body fat covering the limbs and torso;
 ability to experience immersion without involuntary physical shock or mental panic;
 ability to resist shivering;
 ability to raise metabolism (and, in some cases, increase blood temperature slightly above the normal level);
 a generalized delaying of metabolic shutdown (including slipping into unconsciousness) as central and peripheral body temperatures fall.

Benefits and Risks of cold water immersion 
Cold water immersion tactics are often employed by athletes to speed up muscle recovery and reduce inflammation and soreness after intense exercise or after trauma.

There are several reported benefits from regular ice swimming, namely:
 Cardiovascular system: Lowering blood pressure
 Endocrine system: Decrease in triglycerides, Increase in insulin sensitivity, Decrease in norepinephrine, Increase in cortisol
 Psychiatric: Antidepressant effect
 Immune system: Increase in leucocytes, Increase in monocytes, Fewer infections

Cold water swimming still poses a significant health risk for inexperienced and untrained swimmers. It is recommended that in order to fully benefit from the metabolic and thermogenic effects of cold water swimming, a grade and progressive acclimatization program is required and preferably done under supervisor.

Cold shock response in other organisms

Cold shock in mammals 
Cold shock has been described in several species and at least part of the physiology is similar, as described above in the Diving Reflex.

Cold shock in bacteria 
A cold shock is when bacteria undergo a significant reduction in temperature, likely due to their environment dropping in temperature. To constitute as a cold shock the temperature reduction needs to be both significant, for example dropping from 37 °C to 20 °C, and it needs to happen over a short period of time, traditionally in under 24 hours. Both prokaryotic and eukaryotic cells are capable of undergoing a cold shock response. The effects of a cold shock in bacteria include:

 Decreased cell membrane fluidity
 Decreased enzyme activity
 Decreased efficiency of transcription and translation
 Decreased efficiency of protein folding
 Decreased ribosome function

The bacteria uses the cytoplasmic membrane, RNA/DNA, and ribosomes as cold sensors in the cell, placing them in charge of monitoring the cell's temperature. Once these sensors send the signal that a cold shock is occurring, the bacteria will pause the majority of protein synthesis in order to redirect its focus to producing what are called cold shock proteins (Csp). The volume of the cold shock proteins produced will depend on the severity of the temperature decrease. The function of these cold shock proteins is to assist the cell in adapting to the sudden temperature change, allowing it to maintain as close to a normal level of function as possible.

One way cold shock proteins are thought to function is by acting as nucleic acid chaperones. These cold shock proteins will block the formation of secondary structures in the mRNA during the cold shock, leaving the bacteria with only single strand RNA. Single strand is the most efficient form of RNA for the facilitation of transcription and translation. This will help to counteract the decreased efficiency of transcription and translation brought about by the cold shock. Cold shock proteins also affect the formation of hairpin structures in the RNA, blocking them from being formed. The function of these hairpin structures is to slow down or decrease the transcription of RNA. So by removing them, this will also help to increase the efficiency of transcription and translation.

Once the initial shock of the temperature decrease has been dealt with, the production of cold shock proteins is slowly tapered off. Instead, other proteins are synthesized in their place as the cell continues to grow at this new lower temperature. However, the rate of growth seen by these bacterial cells at colder temperatures is often lower than the rates of growth they exhibit at warmer temperatures.

Transcriptional response of Escherichia coli to cold shock 
Cold shocks cause the repression of several hundreds of genes in the bacterium E. coli. Many of these genes are repressed quickly after the decrease in temperature, while others are only affected several hours after this event. The repression mechanism is described in. Shortly, during cold-shocks, cellular energy levels decrease. This hampers the efficiency by which DNA gyrases remove positive supercoils produced by transcription events, whose accumulation eventually blocks future transcription events.

Many of the genes repressed during cold shock are involved in cell metabolism. By knowing the mechanism by which these genes respond, one can potentially tune it, in genetically modified bacteria, to modify at which temperature is the response to cold shock activated. This modification could reduce the energy costs of bioreactors.

See also

References

Sources
Introduction to Frozen Mythbusters and Myth #1. Wilderness Medicine Newsletter. Sourced 2008-05-17.

Effects of external causes
Physiology
Wilderness medical emergencies
Causes of death

de:Kälteschockregulation